The 2014 Pan American Fencing Championships were held in San José, Costa Rica from 1 June to 6 June 2014.

Medal summary

Men's events

Women's events

Medal table

References

2014
Pan American Fencing Championships
International sports competitions hosted by Costa Rica
Fencing competitions in Costa Rica
2014 in Costa Rican sport
Pan American Fencing Championships